The Canadian Vickers Vedette was the first aircraft designed and built in Canada to meet a specification for Canadian conditions. It was a single-engine biplane flying boat purchased to meet a Royal Canadian Air Force (RCAF) demand for a smaller aircraft than the Vickers Viking with a much greater rate of climb, to be suitable for forestry survey and fire protection work. The type went on to have a long and distinguished career in civil operations in Canada. Most of the topographical maps in use in Canada today are based on photos taken from these aircraft.

Design and development

Based on a preliminary design in early 1924 for a "flying boat" by R.K.Pierson of the British company Vickers, the Canadian Vickers Vedette was a two/three-seat single-engine pusher aircraft. The design was passed over to the subsidiary Canadian Vickers Limited of Longueuil, Quebec (formed in 1911) where Wilfrid Thomas Reid served as Chief Engineer.

The prototype Vedette I was first flown on 4 November 1924, powered by a  Rolls-Royce Falcon III. It was subsequently fitted with  Wolseley Viper,  Wright J-4 and  Armstrong Siddeley Lynx engines for testing. Several versions of the Vedette were produced, including two amphibious versions and one with an enclosed cabin on an all-metal hull. With the exception of these major changes, most of the remaining differences between versions were relatively minor and not externally visible. Each version was produced with a range of optional engine types.

Canadian Vickers Limited developed and produced a series of follow-up designs intended for use in the Canadian north (none were related design-wise to the Vedette):
 Canadian Vickers Vista A small monoplane pusher, almost a Vedette without the top wing.
 Canadian Vickers Varuna Twin-engine seaplane, essentially a scaled-up Vedette.
 Canadian Vickers Vancouver Similar to the Varuna, but with detail improvements.
 Canadian Vickers Vanessa Biplane floatplane.

Operational history
The first production example was provided to Fairchild Aerial Surveys (c/n 31 G-CAFF) before they started designing their own survey aircraft. The majority of the production run was purchased by the RCAF where the aircraft proved popular and versatile, if somewhat temperamental due to leaky hulls that required constant maintenance (a problem afflicting all wooden hulled flying boats). The Vedette undertook photographic and forestry patrols satisfactorily and provided a backbone for RCAF flying operations through the lean peacetime years. Vedettes started a coast-to-coast photographic survey that was needed to map out the large areas of the country still unmapped. These missions lasted until the outbreak of the Second World War, and would be completed after the war with newer types. Vedettes stationed on both coasts were also used for fishing and smuggling patrols, both with the RCAF and with Western Canada Airways.

The Vedette featured prominently in a number of mercy missions, while some airmen discovered it was nearly ideal for aerial goose hunting, at least until a pilot was hit by a goose. The first Canadian to join the Caterpillar Club by using a parachute to escape from an aircraft did so from RCAF Vedette "ZF" on 17 May 1929. The pilot, C.S. (Jack) Caldwell, while testing the aircraft at the Canadian Vickers factory, entered an uncontrollable spin after the engine failed and bailed out successfully over the St. Lawrence River.

The RCAF acquired one Wright J-4 engined Vedette I in 1925 and 18 Armstrong-Siddeley Lynx IV engined Vedette IIs from 1926 onwards. All of these were out of service before the Second World War began. Starting in 1929, the RCAF acquired 13 Vedette Vs with a higher gross weight, and 11 fitted with Handley Page wing slots as the Vedette Va. The single Vedette VI, with Wright J-6 engine, featured a metal hull and an enclosed cockpit. A mark V was refurbished by the factory and as the sole Vam was given a new metal hull, as well as a new serial number (the last), but it retained its RCAF call sign as "ZD." The Mk VI and seven Vedette Va flying boats survived into wartime service, flying with No 4(BR) Squadron and the Seaplane and Bomber Reconnaissance Training School (later No 13 OT Sqn) in Vancouver, BC until May 1941.

In addition to the RCAF, The Ontario, Manitoba and Saskatchewan provincial governments used Vedettes extensively for scouting out forest fires in the heavily wooded areas of those provinces.

The company exported six Wright J-5 powered Vedette Vs to Chile, where they were based at Puerto Montt (which is on an inlet off the Pacific coast) with the Escuadrilla de Anfibios N° 1 (now known as the Grupo de Aviación N° 5). They were used to forge an air link between there and the capital Santiago,  up the coast. At least one of the Vedettes (and possibly all six) was lost due to hurricane-force winds, which also caused the loss of two lives when one of the aircraft overturned while on the water.

Operators
 Canada
 Royal Canadian Air Force (45 used)
 Fairchild Aerial Surveys (1 used)
 Manitoba (Government) Air Service (7 used)
 Ontario Provincial Air Service (2 used)
 Government of Saskatchewan (5 used)
 Western Canada Airways Ltd. (1 used)
 Canadian Airways (1 used)

 Chile
 Chilean Air Force
 Escuadrilla de Anfibios N° 1 (6 used)

Variants
Vedette I
Prototype (c/n 9) tested variously with Rolls-Royce Falcon III, Wolseley Viper, Wright J-4 and Armstrong Siddeley Lynx engines.
Vedette II
Production version, modified rudder and other minor changes from prototype.
Vedette III & IV
Not built, but may have included an enclosed cabin transport.
Vedette V
Improved amphibian version, but most not equipped with wheels.
Vedette Va
Mk.V fitted with Handley-Page leading edge slots.
Vedette Vam
One off Mk.V (c/n 123/170) refurbished with metal hull.
Vedette VI
One off (c/n 163) with metal hull and Handley-Page leading edge slots.
Vassal I
Proposed variant using Clark Y airfoil section wings, not built.

Survivors

There are no original intact surviving examples of the Vickers Vedette known to exist. There are, however two replicas in Canadian museums.

The first is a replica of a Vedette V (CF-MAG) at the Royal Aviation Museum of Western Canada, Winnipeg, Manitoba. Unveiled on 24 May 2002, this replica was built using templates made from analyzing the remains of three separate Vedette wrecks. These fragments from three separate aircraft would form the groundwork for the creation of blueprints. This project took a group of more than 100 dedicated volunteers 22 years to complete. The build was aided by hand drawn plans created by one of the WCAM volunteers who had been employed by Canadian Vickers as a junior draughtsman. The replica was built according to airworthy standards of the 1920s, however the museum has no plans to fly it, and it has not been certified.

While three wrecks were used, the bulk of the information was contributed by CF-MAG. For this reason, it was decided to include this former registration number on the hull for historical authenticity.

The original CF-MAG was built in 1929 and was placed in storage until it was purchased by the Government of Manitoba in 1934, along with five ex-RCAF Vedettes (for $1 each) to be used for forest fire patrols. In 1937, the engine of CF-MAG failed while on a flight to Cormorant Lake, Manitoba. The pilot touched down in a swamp, then walked to an area where he could be rescued. A week later, an attempt was made to retrieve the downed aircraft, but the swamp was too small to permit takeoff. After all the usable parts were salvaged, the hull was soaked with fuel and the Vedette set on fire.

A second wreck was recovered (G-CASW), which had crashed into a mountain on Porcher Island British Columbia while conducting a forest fire survey and was also recovered to aid in the design and blueprinting by WCAM.

Finally, preserved pieces of a third Vedette were loaned to the museum by the National Aeronautical Museum in Ottawa.

The second replica is on display at the Saskatchewan Western Development Museum In 2003, the WDM acquired part of an original hull, which is displayed as an artifact in condition as found. With plans loaned from the Western Canada Aviation Museum, a group of volunteers from the Vintage Aircraft Restorers undertook the construction. It has been completed as of early 2017. In 2014, the VAR Vendette Project won a Ninety-Nines Canadian Award in Aviation.

Specifications (Mk II, Lynx engine)

See also

References

Further reading

External links

 
 Film of the Vickers Vedette operating in BC
 Canadian Vickers Vedette – British Aircraft of World War II
 Canadian Air Force

Single-engined pusher aircraft
Flying boats
Science and technology in Canada
Vedette
1920s Canadian civil aircraft
Biplanes
Aircraft first flown in 1924